Parasa minwangi is a moth of the family Limacodidae. It is found in the Nanling Mountains of southern China (Henan, Guangxi, Anhui, Hubei, Sichuan, Yunnan, Shaanxi and Gansu). The habitat consists of mid-elevation mountain areas (altitudes ranging from 600 to 1,400 meters).

The wingspan is 21–22 mm. The forewing ground colour is chestnut with an ochreous stripe and a large median green patch delimited by slender white lines and a subsequent wide brown border. The hindwings are chestnut. Adults have been recorded on wing in April, May, June, August and September, possibly in two generations per year.

Etymology
The species is named in honour of Dr. Min Wang, who represents the main collector of most of the type material of the species.

References

Moths described in 2013
Limacodidae
Moths of Asia